Nquma scalpta is a species of sea snail, a marine gastropod mollusk in the family Horaiclavidae.

Description
The length of the shell varies between 10 mm and 15 mm.

Distribution
This marine species occurs off East London, South Africa, and off Mozambique

References

 Steyn, D.G. & Lussi, M. (1998) Marine Shells of South Africa. An Illustrated Collector’s Guide to Beached Shells. Ekogilde Publishers, Hartebeespoort, South Africa, ii + 264 pp. page(s): 154

External links
 Kilburn, R. N. "Turridae (Mollusca: Gastropoda) of southern Africa and Mozambique. Part 4. Subfamilies Drilliinae, Crassispirinae and Strictispirinae." Annals of the Natal Museum 29.1 (1988): 167–320.
  Tucker, J.K. 2004 Catalog of recent and fossil turrids (Mollusca: Gastropoda). Zootaxa 682:1–1295.
 

scalpta
Gastropods described in 1988